4F is a Polish clothing company established in 2003 and headquartered in Wieliczka, in southern Poland. The company is owned by OTCF S.A. whose other subsidiaries include brands like Outhorn and 4Faces. It offers sports, tourism and casual wear clothing as well as accessories. The brand currently operates 230 stores in East-Central Europe and its products are present in around 500 multi-brand stores in 40 countries.

4F manufactures a wide range of sportswear and casual wear products, such as t-shirts, shorts, jackets, swimsuits, sandals, flip-flops, bags and backpacks. Company's sports equipment includes ski suits and bicycle helmets.

History
In 2003, the Horn Partner company (currently OTCF S.A.) opened its first retail store offering sportswear under the 4Fun brand. In 2007, the company changed the name to 4F Performance, and since 2010 it has adopted the 4F name. In 2008, it officially started cooperation with the Polish Olympic Committee (PKOl). The brand was selected to dress Polish athletes at the 2010 Winter Olympics in Vancouver, 2012 Summer Olympics in London, 2014 Winter Olympics in Sochi, 2015 European Games in Baku as well as 2016 Summer Olympics in Rio de Janeiro. It also provided sportswear clothing to young Polish athletes at the Youth Olympic Games in Singapore and Nanjing. Besides the PKOl, since 2010, the company has also been collaborating with the Polish Paralympic Committee.

4F cooperates with seven other national olympic committees and has dressed 8 national representations, including teams from Poland, Serbia, Croatia, Latvia, Greece, North Macedonia, Lithuania and Slovakia.

In 2016, 4F company opened its first stores abroad in Latvia, Slovakia, Romania and the Czech Republic.

The brand is also an official partner of such organizations as the Polish Ski Federation (2007), Polish Biathlon Association (2010), Polish Athletic Association (2013), Polish Speed Skating Association (2014), the Polish Handball Federation (2017) and the Slovak Biathlon Association (2018).

In 2018, the 4F company was unveiled as one of the officials presenting sponsors of the Four Hills Tournament held in Germany and Austria for the four next upcoming editions of the event as well as the FIS Alpine World Ski Championships in 2021. The company also opened its first store in Asia in Bangkok, Thailand. In 2020, the company became one of the official global partners of the 7th edition of the Wings for Life World Run. The company also opened its first flagship store in Ukraine in Kyiv with two more openings planned by the end of the year.

In 2021, the company has begun its cooperation with the Polish volleyball team ZAKSA Kędzierzyn-Koźle, the winner of 2020–21 CEV Champions League. From the last EuroBasket 2022, the company become the new official supplier of Poland national basketball team played at home.

Ambassadors of the brand
 Iwona Bernardelli – long-distance runner 
 Marcin Chabowski – long-distance runner  
 Natalia Czerwonka – speed skater
 Paulína Bátovská Fialková – biathlete
 Paula Gorycka – cyclist
 Slavomír Glesk – ultra trail runner
 Monika Hojnisz – biathlete
 Maciej Kot – ski jumper      
 Łukasz Kubot – tennis player
 Wilfredo Leon – volleyball player
 Robert Lewandowski – footballer
 Katarzyna Niewiadoma – cyclist
 Kamil Stoch – ski jumper

See also
Sportswear
Fashion industry
Economy of Poland

References

External links
 

Polish companies established in 2007
Clothing companies established in 2007
Retail companies established in 2007
Polish brands
Sportswear brands
Clothing companies of Poland